Henry Downes may refer to:

Harry Downes (1910–1970), American football player and coach
Henry Downes (bishop) (died 1735), Irish Anglican bishop

See also
Henry Downs (disambiguation)